Edward J. Fraughton (born March 22, 1939, Park City, Utah) is an American artist, sculptor, and inventor. He is primarily known for his epic monumental works and individual collector editions that often relate to the history of the American West.  Fraughton's stylistic goals follow the American Neo-classic/Beaux-Arts, impressionistic realism traditions of J. Q. A. Ward, Henry Merwin Shrady, James Earle Fraser, Hermon Atkins MacNeil, Daniel Chester French, Augustus Saint Gaudens, Cyrus Dallin, Gutzon and Solon Borglum, and American animaliers Arthur Putnam, Edward Kemeys, Phimister Proctor. A literal sculptor with an academic background in design and human anatomy, Fraughton's versatility covers a broad spectrum of human and animal subjects.

Education

Fraughton attended Marsac Elementary School and in 1957 graduated from Park City High School. Entering the University of Utah as a civil engineering student, Fraughton later changed his major to sculpture and graduated in 1962 with a Bachelor of Fine Arts (BFA) degree.  While there, he studied, served as a student teaching assistant, assisted in the gross anatomy lab and did his post graduate work under the legendary Dr. Avard T. Fairbanks and his son, Justin.  He also played baritone horn in the university marching and concert bands.

Professional career

Following his formal education, which he largely financed by working night shifts at local steel fabrication plant, Fraughton struggled to make ends meet by working in sales, serving as a substitute high school teacher, driving truck as a delivery boy and laboring as a foundry worker in a local bronze casting facility.  In 1966, he was hired by Thiokol Chemical Corporation to apply his artistic training at the newly opened Job Corps Center in Clearfield, Utah. Managed by the Office of Economic Opportunity (OEO), Job Corps was an initiative launched by the Lyndon B. Johnson administration to fight the "War on Poverty". After the first year of operations, on August 22, 1967, Fraughton received a letter from W. C. Hearnton, assistant director of avocational training, stating in part:

Resigning from the Job Corps in 1967 to launch his full-time career as a professional sculptor, Fraughton's first sculpture commission involved creating a series of historical portraits for the Church of Jesus Christ of Latter-day Saints. In 1968 he was commissioned by the Sons of Utah Pioneers and Mormon Battalion associations to create a heroic monument commemorating the historic Mormon Battalion trek from Fort Leavenworth, Kansas, to San Diego during the 1846–1847 Mexican–American War. His heroic 12-foot monumental Mormon Battalion Soldier stands at the highest point in San Diego's Presidio Park.

National recognition began to mount in 1973 when Fraughton was awarded his first gold medal at the National Academy of Western Art for his sculpture entitled, Where Trails End.  Awards from the National Sculpture Society, National Academy of Design and other prestigious art organizations soon followed. In 1980, Fraughton was selected to create the inaugural medal for President Ronald Reagan.  During his eight years in office, a copy of Where Trails End was exhibited in President Reagan's private office in the White House. The same piece is now on permanent display at the Reagan Presidential Library in Simi Valley, California.

Recent sculpture projects

One of Fraughton's most recent works involves a ten-year collaborative effort with fellow sculptors, Kent Ullberg and Blair Buswell. Commissioned by the First National Bank of Omaha, the heroic bronze installation titled, Nebraska Wilderness and Pioneer Courage, depicts a historic pioneer wagon train moving west through Nebraska's wilderness during the mid-19th century. Encountering a herd of wild American bison, the animals quickly turn and run through the city streets toward the bank's new 40-story office building. As the buffalo approach an elevated pond and fountain facing the building's front entrance, a flock of Canada geese explode from the water, fly around the surrounding air space and through the windows of a glassed-in atrium housing the building's historic facade. The geese slowly morph from traditional bronze into modern polished stainless steel as they enter the building. The artistic effect and integration of all elements create a unique and startling effect in the world of contemporary realist sculpture. This project is the largest single installation of monumental sculpture in North America, the linear space covering an area of approximately five city blocks.

Another more recently completed monument depicts an ancient ancestral rock-climbing Puebloan Indian descending a sheer narrow column of sandstone with a basket of corn. Indicative of the ancient cliff-dweller culture of the American Southwest, the twenty-foot high monument graces the new visitor's center and museum entrance of Mesa Verde National Park near Cortez, Colorado.

Inventor

Following a mid-air collision over the Salt Lake Valley in 1987 that destroyed two airplanes and claimed ten lives, Fraughton, a pilot, invented and patented a new technology for tracking aircraft. This technology, now most popularly known as ADS-B, uses GPS satellite tracking to find and report aircraft positions. Fraughton's U.S. patent, (number 5,153,836) and foreign patents were issued in 1992. Subsequently, he served on several committees associated with the Federal Aviation Administration (FAA), most notably the original ADS committee and Special Committee 186 of the Radio Technical Commission for Aeronautics. ADS-B has recently been announced as the FAA's system of choice to upgrade and replace the outdated radar based air traffic control technology.

In the field of sculpture, Fraughton has developed an improved method for enlarging his sculpture into monumental scale. Using digital imaging and CNC cutting, his technique allows positive clay components to be produced to any scale with greater integrity, thus improving efficiency during the direct modeling stage.

Public service

 Park City, Utah, Planning Commission, 1962–1963
 South Jordan Planning Commission, 1977–1985
 Jordan River Advisory Counsel, 1980
 National Sculpture Society Board of Directors, 2002
 White House Fellows Presidents Commission on White House Fellows, Rocky Mountain Region Panel 1981–1988
 Moscow Conference on Law and Bilateral Economic Development, 1991

Monuments

 Cliff-Climber monument representing the ancient Anasazi Indian culture, National Park Service, Mesa Verde National Park, Colorado
 Pioneer Courage Monument, First National Bank of Omaha, Omaha, Nebraska
 John Wayne, National Cowboy and Western Heritage Museum, Oklahoma City, Oklahoma
 Finding the Way, Salt Lake City, Utah
 Jason Rendell portrait, Boston, Massachusetts
 Gandy Dancer, Union Station Museum, Ogden, Utah
 Bitter Strength, Union Station Museum, Ogden, Utah
 The Iron Lady, portrait of Margaret Thatcher, International Gardens, Salt Lake City, Utah
 Clearing the Haul-way, Rock Springs, Wyoming
 The Cadet, Randolph-Macon Academy Front Royal, Virginia
 Monument to Education, Ricks College Rexburg, Idaho
 Spirit of Wyoming, State Capitol, Cheyenne, Wyoming
 Truman Angell, Architect, The Church of Jesus Christ of Latter-day Saints, Salt Lake City, Utah
 Thomas E. Ricks, Ricks College Rexburg, Idaho
 Winter Quarters. Florence, Nebraska
 All is Well, Songbook/Eliza Snow, William Clayton, and Brigham Young monuments, Brigham Young Cemetery, Salt Lake City, Utah
 Mormon Battalion Monument, Presidio Park, San Diego, California

Awards
 2010 Henry Hering Memorial Medal, National Sculpture Society, Pioneer Courage Monument
 2010 Director's Award, Springville Spring Salon, Prairie Lullaby
 2010 Award Of Excellence, American Society of Landscape Architects, Pioneer Courage Monument
 2004 People's Choice Award, Prix de West, Home is Where the Heart Is
 1993 Gold Medal, National Academy of Western Art, The Candidate
 1992 Silver Medal, National Academy of Western Art, The Taste of Honey
 1987 Gold Medal, National Academy of Western Art, ...One Nation...
 1985 Greenwich Workshop Award, Museum of the Rockies
 1984 Experience the West Award, Museum of the Rockies
 1983 Honors in the Arts Award, Salt Lake Area Chamber of Commerce
 1981 Tallix Foundry Prize, National Sculpture Society, Spirit of Man
 1981 Artist of the West, San Dimas Festival of Western Arts.
 1980 Outstanding Utah Artist Award, Snowbird Institute
 1979 Lance International Prize, National Sculpture Society, Waterlilies
 1979 Ellin P. Speyer Prize, National Academy of Design, The Last Arrow
 1977 Gold Medal, National Academy of Western Art, Anasazi
 1975 Gold Medal, National Academy of Western Art, The Last Farewell
 1973 Gold Medal, National Academy of Western Art, Where Trails End
 1949 1st Place, Milton Bradley Company "America the Beautiful" Crayon Art Competition (Utah)

Gallery

Print and film appearances

 Saving America - I – II – III Steps to Saving America, October 2016
 Kindred Spirits II - On the Road to Modernism, 2008
 The Story of Leanin' Tree: Art and Enterprise in the American West, Leanin' Tree, Inc., 2008 
 Western Traditions: Contemporary Artists of the American West, Fresco Fine Art Publications, 2005 
 Davenport's Art Reference and Price Guide 2006–2007, 2005
 Art of the West, July/August 2002
 Art of the West Guidebook, 2001
 Leading the West, Hagerty, 1997 
 Southwest Art, May 1993
 Art of the West, February 6, 1991
 Ricks College Centennial Calendar cover, 1988–1989
 Lodestar, Winter 1988
 Cheyenne, Wyoming, telephone directory cover, 1987
 Frankfurter Allgemeine Zeitung, April 1986
 This People, May 1985
 Profiles in American Art, PBS television series; Ken Meyer, 1982
 Men of Achievement, International Biographical Centre, 1982
 Contemporary Western Artists, Samuels; Southwest Art Publishing, 1982 
 Southwest Art, October 1982
 Art of the West, August/September 1982
 The Rotarian, August 1982
 American Artists of Renown, 1981–1982
 Expression Magazine, July 1981
 Treasures of the American West, Harrison Eiteljorg; Balance House, 1981
 Time, December 19, 1980
 U.S. News & World Report, December 22, 1980
 Artists of the Rockies and the Golden West, Spring 1980
 Who's Who in American Art, Bowker, 1976–2004
 Town & Country, January 1977
 Cowboy, Whitney Museum catalog, 1975
 Bronzes of the American West, Patricia Broder; Abrams, 1975
 Persimmon Hill, volumes 3, #3, #4; 5, #4, 1974

References

External links
 
 National Museum of Wildlife Art - Artist Biography. Retrieved April 6, 2009.

Sculptors from Utah
Artists of the American West
Living people
University of Utah alumni
1939 births
People from Park City, Utah